The Megalosporaceae are a family of mostly lichen-forming fungi belonging to the class Lecanoromycetes in the division Ascomycota. Most species have a tropical distribution. The family contains three genera (Megaloblastenia, 
Megalospora, and Sipmaniella) and 38 species.

References

Lecanoromycetes families
Teloschistales
Lichen families
Taxa named by Josef Hafellner
Taxa described in 1982